The men's coxless pair competition at the 2016 Summer Olympics in Rio de Janeiro was held from 6 to 11 August at the Lagoon Rodrigo de Freitas.

The medals for the competition were presented by Barry Maister, New Zealand, member of the International Olympic Committee, and the gifts were presented by Jean-Christophe Rolland, France, President of the International Rowing Federation.

Results

Heats
First three of each heat qualify to the semifinals, remainder goes to the repechage.

Heat 1

Heat 2

Heat 3
Many of the competitors criticised that the regatta was not called off due to the challenging conditions. Miloš Vasić and Nenad Beđik capsized and did not get back into the boat, but the International Rowing Federation (FISA) ruled that despite their DNF they could compete in the repechage.

Repechage
First three of heat qualify to the semifinals.

Semifinals
First three of each heat qualify to the Final A, remainder goes to the Final B.

Semifinal 1

Semifinal 2

Final

Final B

Final A

References

Men's coxless pair
Men's events at the 2016 Summer Olympics